Leading football players aged under 20 represented nations of Oceania in the 2007 season of the OFC U-20 Championship.

Coach:  Stu Jacobs

Coach:  Juan Carlos Buzzetti

Coach:

Coach:

Coach:

Coach:

Coach: 

OFC U-20 Championship squads